Marine Transfer Operations are conducted at many ports around the world between tanker ships, barges, and marine terminals. Specifically, once the marine vessel is secure at the dock a loading arm or transfer hose is connected between a valve header on the dock and the manifold header on the vessel. A marine transfer of petroleum products cannot be conducted unless it is supervised by a person-in-charge (PIC) on the vessel who is seafarer in the Merchant Marine and another person-in-charge on the dock.

Person-in-charge 
The person-in-charge on the dock is called a Loading master-PIC and the person-in charge on the barge will be the Tankerman-PIC. The person-in-charge on a tanker ship will be the deck officer who monitors the transfer of product in the cargo control room. All persons-in-charge must have special training in order to obtain the proper credentials such as licensing and endorsement on their merchant mariner documents.

Marine surveyor 

Loading Masters work closely with the marine surveyor in agreeing to the sequence of the transfer. Such as whether any product sampling will take place prior to commencement, determining if a line displacement will occur, agreeing on whether the final stop at completion will either be a shore stop or a draft stop on the vessel. The marine surveyor gauges the vessel's tanks and shore tanks to ensure the correct amount of product is transferred. Additionally, the surveyor or inspector will obtain product samples on the marine vessel and shore tank for laboratory analysis to ensure that the product meets all specifications of purity.

Regulations 
Transfer operations and commencement of a transfer is highly regulated throughout the world with consideration of the environment with potential of water pollution occurring if petroleum product is released into the water during the transfer. Federal, state, and local laws must be observed during marine transfer operations. 

Maritime Security (USCG), occupational safety and health regulations must be adhered to in addition to environmental regulations during marine transfer operations. These regulation's are enforced by local state port control organizations such as the United States Coast Guard in the United States.

Marine transfer operators

A marine transfer operation occurs between three main stakeholders which includes the Loading Master-PIC, Vessel Person-In -Charge PIC, and marine surveyor or inspector. These individuals communicate prior to the transfer agreeing on the sequence of events that will occur before, during, and after the transfer. During the course of the transfer the Loading Master is in continuous two way radio contact with the vessel Person-In-Charge and standing by to stop the transfer immediately if any problems develop such as leaks at the transfer hose or loading arm.

See also
 Barge
 Tanker
 Oil tanker
 Marine loading arm

External links
 Marine Transfer Operations 
 Barges News 
 Google Group Marine Transfer Operations

Water transport
Barges
Water pollution